Dolní Bečva is a municipality and village in Vsetín District in the Zlín Region of the Czech Republic. It has about 1,900 inhabitants.

Geography
Dolní Bečva is nestled in a valley of the Moravian-Silesian Beskids. It lies on the Bečva River. The highest point of the municipality is the Radhošť mountain, its peak lies on the municipal border.

History
The first written mention of Dolní Bečva is from 1597.

Sights

In the centre of Dolní Bečva is the Church of Saint Anthony of Padua, built in the Neoromanesque style in 1906.

On the Radhošť mountain there are located the Chapel of Saints Cyril and Methodius, and the Radegast sculpture by Albin Polasek (the original from 1929 was replaced with a copy in 1998).

Twin towns – sister cities

Dolní Bečva is twinned with:
 Kamenec pod Vtáčnikom, Slovakia

References

External links

Villages in Vsetín District